Fodder Creek is a stream in the U.S. state of Georgia.

Fodder Creek was named after Chief Fodder, a Cherokee tribal leader. A variant name is "Fodders Creek".

References

Rivers of Georgia (U.S. state)
Rivers of Towns County, Georgia